Leets Vale is a village near Sydney, in the state of New South Wales, Australia. It is 83 kilometres north-west of the Sydney central business district, in the local government area of The Hills Shire. The Hawkesbury River flows through the locality.

The area is scarcely populated and is not linked by any public transport. It is only accessible by road.

References

Suburbs of Sydney
City of Hawkesbury
Hawkesbury River
The Hills Shire